Zaanstad is a Dutch municipality in the province of North Holland, situated northwest of Amsterdam. Its main city is Zaandam. It is part of the conurbation and metropolitan area of Amsterdam.

Topography

Population centres
The municipality of Zaanstad is a conurbation itself and consists of the following cities, towns, villages and/or districts: Assendelft, Koog aan de Zaan, Krommenie, Westzaan, Wormerveer, Zaandam, Zaandijk. However, being surrounded by countryside and due to its relatively protracted shape that follows the river Zaan, a rural atmosphere is always nearby.

Railway stations in Zaanstad
 Koog aan de Zaan railway station (formerly Koog Bloemwijk)
 Krommenie-Assendelft railway station
 Wormerveer railway station
 Zaandam railway station
 Zaandam Kogerveld railway station
 Zaandijk Zaanse Schans railway station (formerly Koog-Zaandijk)

Local government
The municipal council of Zaanstad consists of 39 seats, which are divided as follows:

PvdA (4), VVD (4), ROSA (4), POV (4),  SP (3), DZ (3), GroenLinks (3), D66 (3), Party for Freedom (3), CDA (2), DENK (2),  Lokaal Zaans (2), PvdD (1), CU (1)

Notable tourist attractions
Zaans Museum
Zaanse Schans
Czar Peter House
Gedempte Gracht, a shopping street in Zaandam

Notable people from Zaanstad

The Arts 

 Pieter Jansz. Saenredam (1597-ca.1665), a painter of the Dutch Golden Age
 Anton Mauve (1838–1888), realist painter, leading member of the Hague School 
 Jan Verkade (1868-1946), post-Impressionist and Christian Symbolist painter
 Piet Zwart (1885–1977), graphic designer, industrial designer and typographer
 Dick Laan (1894–1973), children's writer and film pioneer
 Aafje Heynis (1924–2015), contralto
 Piet Kee (1927–2018), organist and composer
 Han Bennink (born 1942), jazz drummer and percussionist
 Kathinka Pasveer (born 1959), flautist

Public thinking & Public Service 

 Adriaan Pelt (1892–1981), journalist, international civil servant and diplomat
 Johannes Kleiman (1896–1959), resident who helped hide Anne Frank and her family
 Hanneke Ippisch (1925–2012), member of the Dutch resistance in World War II
 Tom Viezee (born 1950), Christian minister and former politician, Mayor of Zeewolde 1999-2004 
 Emine Bozkurt (born 1967), politician

Science & Business 

 Pieter Bleeker (1819–1878), medical doctor, ichthyologist, and herpetologist
 Christiaan Eijkman (1858–1930), physician and professor of physiology, joint winner the Nobel Prize for Physiology or Medicine in 1929 for the discovery of vitamins
 Cornelis Zwikker (1900–1985), scientist, mostly in physics, chemistry and acoustics
 E. G. van de Stadt (1910–1999), yacht designer
 Simon de Wit (1912–1976), rower and CEO of the supermarket chain Simon de Wit 
 Gerrit Jan Heijn (1931–1987), businessman with Ahold, kidnapped and murdered
 Floris Takens (1940–2010), mathematician
 Willem Ouweneel (born 1944), biologist, philosopher and theologian

Sport 

 Jaap Boot (1903-1986), athlete, bronze medallist in the 1924 Summer Olympics
 Jaap Kraaier (1913–2004), flatwater canoeist, bronze medallist at the 1936 Summer Olympics
 Nicolaas Tates (1915–1990), canoeist, bronze medallist at the 1936 Summer Olympics
 Mieke Jaapies (born 1943), sprint canoer, silver medallist in the 1972 Summer Olympics 
 Cees Stam (born 1945), a former track cyclist and four-time world champion stayer
 Toos Beumer (born 1947), swimmer, team bronze medallist at the 1964 Summer Olympics
 Johnny Rep (born 1951), former footballer
 Annemarie Sanders (born 1958), an equestrian, silver medallist in the Team Dressage 1992 Summer Olympics
 Luc Nijholt (born 1961), football manager and a former player
 Ronald Koeman (born 1963), retired footballer and ex-manager of the Barcelona since 2020. 
 Erwin Koeman (born 1961), retired footballer 
 Wietse van Alten (born 1978), an archer, bronze medallist 2000 Summer Olympics
 Bilal Başaçıkoğlu (born 1995), footballer

International relations

Twin towns – sister cities
Zaanstad is twinned with:

Gallery

References

External links

 
Municipalities of North Holland